David Van Zandt is an American attorney, legal scholar, and academic administrator. He served as president of The New School from Jan. 2011 to Apr. 15, 2020. Earlier he served as Dean of Northwestern University Pritzker School of Law, from 1995 to 2011. He has taught courses in international financial markets, business associations, property, practical issues in business law, and legal realism. He is an expert in business associations, international business transactions, property law, jurisprudence, law and social science, and legal education.

Early life and education
Van Zandt was born in 1953 in Montgomery, N.J. and raised in New Jersey along with his three siblings. He graduated from Princeton University with a Bachelor of Arts degree in Sociology. In 1981, he earned a Juris Doctor from Yale Law School, where he served as managing editor for the Yale Law Journal. He earned his PhD in Sociology at the London School of Economics and Political Science.

Career 
He clerked for Judge Pierre N. Leval in the United States District Court for the Southern District of New York and Justice Harry Blackmun of the United States Supreme Court from 1982 to 1983. He also was an associate with Davis Polk & Wardwell in New York.

Van Zandt joined Northwestern University faculty in 1985 and became dean in 1995. He is the second longest-serving law dean in Northwestern history.

In 2011, Van Zandt was named the eighth president of the New School in New York City and served until April 2020.

David Van Zandt also serves as treasurer of the American Bar Foundation, director of AMR Research, and is a board member of both the American Law Deans Association and AMC Networks.

He is a member of the Council on Foreign Relations.

Personal life
In the late 1980s, he married Lisa Huestis. The couple have two children. They moved to Chicago when Van Zandt was offered a job as a professor at Northwestern Law. After being named the 8th president of the New School, Van Zandt and his family moved to New York at the beginning of 2011.

Selected works
"The Breadth of Life in the Law" (Cardozo Law Review 1992)
"An Alternative Theory of Practical Reason in Judicial Decisions" (Tulane Law Review 1991)
"Commonsense Reasoning, Social Change, and the Law" (Northwestern Law Review 1987, M. Perry & R. Levin eds. Cambridge University Press 1990)
"Neutralizing the Regulatory Burden: The Use of Equity Securities by Foreign Corporate Acquirers" (Yale Law Journal 1980)

See also 
 List of law clerks of the Supreme Court of the United States (Seat 2)

References

External links
 David E. Van Zandt faculty page at Northwestern University School of Law

Northwestern University Pritzker School of Law faculty
Living people
American lawyers
Law clerks of the Supreme Court of the United States
Yale Law School alumni
Princeton University alumni
Deans of law schools in the United States
Alumni of the London School of Economics
1953 births
Davis Polk & Wardwell lawyers